Tropical Storm Gamma was the 25th storm of the 2005 Atlantic hurricane season. Gamma formed on November 18 from a tropical wave which had left the coast of Africa on November 3. Between November 13 and November 16 the system was designated Tropical Depression Twenty-Seven and moved westward through the Windward Islands into the Caribbean. Although its winds were not of tropical storm force, the storm brought damagingly heavy rainfall to Trinidad and to St. Vincent and the Grenadines.

On November 18, after a period of disorganization during which it appeared to be dissipating, the system strengthened and was upgraded to a tropical storm off the coast of Honduras and given the name Gamma. There, its torrential rainfall triggered deadly landslides. Gamma's winds and rains also reached into Belize, where they were less deadly. The storm dissipated on November 22, having killed 39 people.

Meteorological history

Tropical Storm Gamma originated out of a tropical wave that moved off the western coast of Africa on November 3. For a late-season tropical wave, the system kept an unusually high amount of convection as it trekked across the Atlantic Ocean. The low pressure area changed little during November 13, producing locally heavy rains in the Caribbean Islands, but not developing. However upper-level shearing winds abated, making conditions conducive for tropical development, and by November 14 the system had formed Tropical Depression Twenty-Seven.

An upper-level trough near the Greater Antilles continued to provide westerly shear that briefly stalled the development, but the system's strong convection persisted. A break in the shear on November 15 enabled the storm to briefly strengthen. Post season analysis showed during this period the system reached tropical storm-status and should have been christened Gamma, but as this was not seen at the time, the storm remained classified Tropical Depression Twenty-Seven. The NHC, believing that the system was dissipating, announced that it was issuing its last advisory on November 16. Soon after, the system slowed down on November 17.

A tropical wave, which had formed over Panama in early November and had produced rainfall in the region, merged into the waning remnants of Tropical Depression Twenty-Seven near Honduras on November 18. The system then regenerated into a tropical storm later that day and was designated Tropical Storm Gamma. The system's strengthening was slow, owing to the presence of high wind shear. It reached peak winds of 50 mph (80 km/h) before the shear exposed the center and its weakening trend began. Despite flares of convection, Gamma weakened into a tropical depression on November 20 and further into a remnant low early on November 21. The low quickly dissipated on November 22 near the Honduran-Nicaraguan border.

Preparations
On November 18 the government of Honduras issued tropical storm warnings for the Bay Islands, Belize issued a tropical storm warning for its entire coast, and Mexico issued a tropical storm watch for the eastern Yucatán Peninsula from the Belize border to Punta Allen. Before dawn the next day, as Gamma drew closer, Mexico modified the watch to a warning for its coast from the Belize border to Punta Gruesa, and expanded the tropical storm watch from Punta Gruesa to Tulum. That afternoon the storm moved away from Belize the southernmost portion of the tropical storm warning was lifted, followed in totality a few hours later. That night, Mexico also lifted its watching and warnings. It was not until the following day, November 20, that the warnings were lifted from the Bay Islands of Honduras.

Because the storm regenerated shortly before it was predicted to make landfall, few advanced preparations for the storm were taken in Honduras. However, constant rainfall for well over a day as Gamma wandered offshore caused floods that forced over 30,000 people to abandon their homes for state-run shelters.

Impact and aftermath

Two people were killed by a mudslide in St. Vincent and the Grenadines on the island of Bequia as Gamma's precursor, Tropical Depression 27, brought heavy rains. Overflowing rivers destroyed seven homes and make several roads impassable. The island's airport was temporarily closed when the tropical depression flooded the terminal and left debris on the runway. Heavy rains caused flooding and landslides, which washed away two bridges on the island of Trinidad, outside the capital Port-of-Spain.

The rainfall triggered flooding and landslides in the northern departments of Gracias a Dios, Colón, Atlántida, Cortés, Yoro, Santa Bárbara, and the Bay Islands which killed 34 people and left 13 missing . These areas had already been affected by Hurricane Wilma and Hurricane Beta about a month earlier. Dozens of bridges were washed away cutting off more than 50,000 people and 2,000 homes were destroyed  of banana crop was destroyed, totalling $13–18 million (2005 USD) in damage.

In Belize, Gamma contributed to the crash of a private plane, operating from an exclusive jungle resort. All three people aboard were killed as it passed through Gamma's outer bands. Five fishermen from Sarteneja were lost at sea during the storm when a large wave capsized their eight-man boat.

The only country suffering lasting damage from the storm was Honduras. After the storm turned out to sea and Gamma's rains desisted, Honduran helicopters began rescuing those stranded by flood waters. The United Nations' World Food Programme spent $460,000 (2005 USD) airlifting 645 tonnes of food, enough for 195,000 five-person families, to northern Honduras. The Red Cross also provided food aid, hygiene kits, blankets and other humanitarian aid to families that had sustained damage to their property or were displaced into shelters. Both of these organizations already had active distribution networks in the country as they were responding to hurricanes Stan, Wilma, and Beta, all of which caused fatalities in Honduras that year.

The government of Andalucía, in Spain, donated 40 million lempiras to aid in disaster efforts, and the United States employed helicopters from a nearby military base to assist Honduran ones in the distribution of food aid. Relative to the hurricanes of previous weeks, the humanitarian needs following Gamma were minimal, and were simply blended into the ongoing efforts.

Naming and records
When Tropical Depression Twenty-seven unexpectedly developed into a tropical storm, it marked the first time that the third letter of the Greek alphabet was used as the name of an Atlantic storm. The next one to be so named was Hurricane Gamma in 2020. Gamma's record-setting formation date as the season's 25th tropical or subtropical storm would stand until 2020, when broken by Hurricane Delta, which formed on October 5.

See also

 Tropical cyclones in 2005
 Other storms named Gamma
 Timeline of the 2005 Atlantic hurricane season
 October 2008 Central America floods – caused by a series of low-pressure areas including Tropical Depression Sixteen

References

External links
The NHC's archive on Tropical Storm Gamma.

γ
γ
γ
γ